Juma Hassan Killimbah (born 5 June 1966) is a Tanzanian CCM politician and Member of Parliament for Iramba Magharibi constituency in the National Assembly of Tanzania since 2005.

References

Living people
Chama Cha Mapinduzi MPs
Tanzanian MPs 2010–2015
1966 births